Porcius can refer to:

 Members of the ancient Roman gens Porcia
 Florian Porcius (1816–1907), a Romanian botanist

See also
 Porcia (disambiguation)